Delphinium carolinianum, commonly known as Carolina larkspur, is a species of perennial flowering plant in the buttercup family. It is native to central and eastern North America, where it is found in prairies and rocky glades. It produces blue to white flowers in the spring.

Four subspecies have been named:
D. carolinianum var. calciphilum - Native to cedar glades of the Southeastern United States
D. carolinianum var. carolinianum - Widespread in central and eastern North America
D. carolinianum var. vimineum - Native to coastal areas of the United States and Mexico
D. carolinianum var. virescens - Native to the Central United States

References

carolinianum